The Giant Baba (Hai Sodatsu) Memorial Six Man Tag Team Tournament, or simply the Giant Baba Six Man Cup, was a professional wrestling memorial event produced by the All-Japan Pro Wrestling (AJPW) promotion, which took place from April 13 to May 12, 2002, at the Nippon Budokan, Iwate Prefectural Gym, Niigata City Gym and Korakuen Hall in Tokyo, Japan. It was the third and final event honoring AJPW founder Shohei "Giant" Baba, the previous shows being the Giant Baba Memorial Spectacular and Giant Baba Memorial Cup in January 2001 and 2002 respectively. Seven professional wrestling matches were held over a three-week period, with both the tournament semi-finals and final match held at Korakuen Hall.

Keiji Mutoh, Kaz Hayashi and George Hines won the tournament by winning three matches all aired on pay-per-view. Over the course of the tournament, they defeated Satoshi Kojima, Tomoaki Honma and Jimmy Yang in the quarter-finals, Taiyō Kea, Mitsuya Nagai and Shigeo Okumura in the semi-finals and Genichiro Tenryu, Arashi and Nobutaka Araya in the final match. Earlier in the semi-finals, between Genichiro Tenryu's team and "Dr. Death" Steve Williams, Mike Rotunda and Yoji Anjo, Anjo accidentally hit Rotunda in the face with a back-fist punch which eventually led to their defeat. Blaming Anjo for the loss, Williams turned his back on Anjoh causing a split between the two former teammates.

Results

Tournament brackets
The tournament took place between April 13 and May 12, 2002. The tournament brackets were:

References

Professional wrestling memorial shows
2002 in professional wrestling
All Japan Pro Wrestling tournaments
Professional wrestling in Tokyo
Tag team tournaments